The Grosser Preis der Freien Hansestadt Bremen was a Group 3 flat horse race in Germany open to thoroughbreds aged three years or older. It was run at Bremen over a distance of 1,600 metres (about 1 mile), and it was scheduled to take place each year in late October or early November.

The event was given Group 3 status in 2002, and it remained at Bremen until 2006. It was staged at Hanover as the Grosser Preis des Autoring Hannover in 2007.

The race was discontinued in 2008.

Records
Most successful horse:
 no horse won this race more than once in the period shown

Leading jockey:
 no jockey won this race more than once in the period shown

Leading trainer since 2002 (2 wins):
 Erika Mäder – Up and Away (2002), Lucidor (2006)

Winners since 2002

 The 2007 running took place at Hanover.

See also
 List of German flat horse races

References

 Racing Post:
 galopp-sieger.de – Grosser Preis der Freien Hansestadt Bremen.
 horseracingintfed.com – International Federation of Horseracing Authorities – Race Detail (2007).
 pedigreequery.com – Grosser Preis der Freien Hansestadt Bremen – Bremen.

Horse races in Germany
Open mile category horse races
Discontinued horse races
Sport in Bremen (city)